John Calvin Curtis (April 17, 1845 – January 17, 1917) was a Lieutenant of the Ninth Regiment Connecticut Volunteer Infantry in the American Civil War, and a Medal of Honor recipient.

Curtis was born on April 17, 1845 in Bridgeport, Connecticut. He enlisted in the Ninth Regiment on August 17, 1861. On August 5, 1862, as a Sergeant-Major at age 17, he became instrumental in repulsing a Confederate attack aimed at recapturing Baton Rouge, Louisiana. During heavy firing, he "voluntarily sought the line of battle and alone and unaided captured 2 prisoners, driving them before him to regimental headquarters at the point of the bayonet." For this act, Curtis received the Medal of Honor on December 16, 1896, the only soldier from the Ninth to be so honored. 

Curtis was later promoted to First Lieutenant. He died on January 17, 1917, and was buried at Mountain Grove Cemetery in Bridgeport.

Medal of Honor citation
He voluntarily sought the line of battle and alone and unaided captured 2 prisoners, driving them before him to regimental headquarters at the point of the bayonet.

See also
List of Medal of Honor recipients
List of American Civil War Medal of Honor recipients: A–F

Notes

References

1845 births
1917 deaths
United States Army Medal of Honor recipients
People of Connecticut in the American Civil War
Union Army officers
Burials at Mountain Grove Cemetery, Bridgeport
American Civil War recipients of the Medal of Honor
Military personnel from Bridgeport, Connecticut